The 2016–17 Gaza Strip Premier League is the 2016–17 season of the top football league in the Gaza Strip of Palestine.

Standings

See also
2016–17 West Bank Premier League
2016–17 Palestine Cup

References

External links
Palestina 2016/17 Gaza Strip League, RSSSF.com

Gaza Strip Premier League seasons
2
Gaza
2016 in the Gaza Strip
2017 in the Gaza Strip